Michael Josias du Plessis (born 4 November 1958) is a former South African rugby union player.

Playing career

Du Plessis played for Western Province, Northern Transvaal, Transvaal, Eastern Province and the Springboks. He made his test debut against the visiting South American Jaguars team on 20 October 1984. Capped 8 times, he scored 1 try for the Springboks.

Test history

Personal
Du Plessis is the brother of Willie du Plessis and Carel du Plessis, both former Springboks, and the father of Daniël du Plessis.

See also
List of South Africa national rugby union players – Springbok no. 537

References

1958 births
Living people
South African rugby union players
South Africa international rugby union players
Western Province (rugby union) players
Rugby union centres
People from Somerset East
Rugby union players from the Eastern Cape